The Women House of Brescia is a 1920 German-language silent film directed by Hubert Moest. The film's alternative name was The House of Pillory. The film was considered highly controversial for the depiction of prostitution. The film's story was set in medieval Europe during the fourteenth century. The film was based on Karl Hans Strobl's novel Das Frauenhaus von Brescia. The Pillory houses were the places where enemy women captured during wartime were imprisoned so that the people could exploit them as they wished. The depiction of prostitution was the basis for the picture's rejection by the British Board of Film Classification in 1921 and its being banned in Germany.

Plot 

In 1311 the coronation of King Henry of the Lombards takes place. After becoming the king he wages war against Italy and Brescia (ruled by Francesco de Barbiano). While campaigning, he sends for his queen, Margaret (Gertrude Welcker), who along with her ladies-in-waiting is captured and imprisoned by Barbiano. Barbiano orders the women to be sent to the House of Pillory. One of her maids, Roswitha (Hedda Vernon), impersonates the queen and asks him to leave the other women safe and capture only her. As a result, she is brought to the house of pillory where people hold a mock coronation with a crown of straw to humiliate her. She is forced into prostitution.

Two captured men, Gottwald (the queen's escort) and Herbolo (Roswitha's fiancé), flee from the house and inform Henry of the event. He is agitated after hearing all the information and vows to attack Brescia in vengeance. Meanwhile, in Brescia, Roswitha quickly gains popularity among the menfolk for her beauty and this makes their wives grow jealous of her. The women demand that Roswitha be handed over to them. They attack the pillory. Luigi, the local hangman, is killed during the struggle and Roswitha is led to the public stocks. Before anything happens to her, a nobleman, Alessandro, who knows her true identity and is in love with her, comes to rescue her.

Henry attacks the city and Alessandro is slain by Herbolo. When the local women come to know of her true identity they ask for Roswitha's forgiveness. In the end Roswitha and Herbolo's marriage takes place and the queen along with the other captives is freed and taken to the palace.

Cast 

 Gertrude Welcker as Queen Margaret
 Ernst Deutsch as Luigi
 Eduard von Winterstein as Francesco
 Hedda Vernon as Roswitha
 Olga Limburg as Barbara
 Josef Peterhans
 Julius Roether
 Toni Zimmerer
 Maria Forescu
 Fritz Jessner
 Joseph Klein
 Fritz Delius
 Gerda Frey as Adelheid
 Blandine Ebinger
 Paul Bildt

Rejection 

In 1921 the film was submitted to the British Board of Film Classification for approval. The censor was very strict regarding the depiction of prostitution in films. Many films had been denied certification on grounds of depiction of prostitution. This was the first time that the Board had to consider a film in which a woman takes to prostitution in order to save other women. The board rejected the film on 23 March 1921 and the film's distributors- Elijah Day & Sons Ltd- accepted the decision and did not attempt to challenge it. The board specified in its 1921 report that depicting the loss of virginity for any purpose would be grounds for rejection. The film was never screened in Britain though the British Film Institute bought a print of the film in 1937.

Ban in Germany 

The film was first screened at Lessing Theater in Hamburg in August 1920 and in September in Berlin. On 27 July 1921 the film was banned by the Film Censor Board following a resolution. An appeal was made to the board which allowed the film's screening from 21 September 1921 only to have the Board ban it again on 5 August 1923 even though the film company had removed a large number of scenes to which the Board objected.

References

External links 
 

1920 films
Films of the Weimar Republic
German silent feature films
German black-and-white films
Films set in the Holy Roman Empire
Films set in Italy
Films set in the 14th century
Films about prostitution in Italy
Films based on Austrian novels
Films based on works by Karl Hans Strobl
1920s historical films
German historical films
Films directed by Hubert Moest
1920s German films